Pseudosphex augusta is a moth of the subfamily Arctiinae. It was described by Herbert Druce in 1884. It is found in Guatemala.

References

Pseudosphex
Moths described in 1884